Harris Farm Markets is an Australian grocery chain with over 30 different locations in New South Wales & Queensland with the majority of stores existing within the Sydney metropolitan area, the Brisbane metropolitan area, and various regional areas in New South Wales including Newcastle, Orange, Bathurst and Albury. The markets specialise in fruit, vegetables, cheeses, breads, delicatessen and gourmet grocery items.

They are Australia's biggest individual retailer of fruit and vegetables and promote 'odd-shaped' fruit called "Imperfect Picks" at lower prices in an initiative to reduce landfills. Harris Farm Markets also produce many of their products in Flemington, New South Wales, including yogurt, frozen goods, salads, juices and milk.

History
Harris Farm Markets was established in 1971, with a single shop in Villawood, New South Wales. The company faced possible bankruptcy in the 1990s when an investor pulled out. Following this, the company rebuilt itself and in 2010, David Harris, the founder, passed on the leadership of the company to three of his five sons, Tristan, Angus and Luke, who are now the Co-CEOs. Other family members in the business include Catherine Harris (Chair person).

Harris Farm Markets was the first Australian exclusively market-style fruit and vegetable retailer to open in a supermarket-style operation. Harris Farm Markets stock fruit and vegetables, cheeses, deli items, and gourmet groceries. It was the first Australian store to introduce a ‘imperfect picks’ concept to combat food waste with offers of discounts on off-cuts and odd-shaped fruit and vegetables. Several long standing stores that were open for decades like Eastgate Bondi Junction and the franchised and independently run Edgecliff site have closed with more modern replacements nearby since 2019.

See also

List of supermarket chains in Oceania

References

External links

Australian companies established in 1971
Retail companies established in 1971
Food and drink companies based in Sydney
Supermarkets of Australia